Ozymandias gilberti is a species of extinct ray-finned fish from the Miocene which was described by David Starr Jordan in 1907 from a single specimen, comprising the skull and some vertebrae, discovered from San Pedro, California. It is thought to be a species of large mackerel or tuna in the family Scombridae. Jordan initially assigned another fossil to this species but changed his mind and assigned the second fossil to the living Cottoid genus Ophiodon, the lingcod, as Ophiodon ozymandias. The specific name honours the discoverer of the fossil Dr James Z. Gilbert.

References

Scombridae
Miocene fish of North America
Taxa named by David Starr Jordan